is a Japanese manga series written and illustrated by Kōji Kumeta. It was serialized in Shogakukan's shōnen manga magazine Weekly Shōnen Sunday from April 1991 to August 1996, with its chapters collected in 23 tankōbon volumes.

Plot
The series follows Getto Rando, who has been living in Canada and playing hockey there since he was ten. However, he also earned himself a very long suspension due to cheating and thus was more or less forced to return to Japan where he was recruited by Hamatsu High School in Kyushu, even though ice hockey is not popular in southern Japan and the school only has a roller hockey rink.

Characters

A very skilled hockey player and has won multiple scoring titles in Canadian leagues of his age group. However, he is not afraid to go outside the rulebook to achieve victory.

Soara is the manager of the hockey team. She is a bit uptight and constantly has to keep Getto and the rest of the hockey club in check.

The coach of the hockey team, Kentaro was the former captain until his need for glasses sidelined him.

Maiko is one of the most voluptuous girls in school and holds the title of Miss Hamatsu High.  She is close friends with Soara.

A former teammate of Getto from Canada. Rob becomes an exchange student and finds himself at Hamatsu High School. Like Getto he was suspended from the leagues in Canada. He was banned for his violent outbreaks.

The gentle giant of the hockey club. He is a timid guy and is often taken advantage of or made fun of by the other members of the hockey club, despite the strength he possesses.

Publication
Go!! Southern Ice Hockey Club is written and illustrated by Kōji Kumeta. It was serialized in Shogakukan's Weekly Shōnen Sunday from April 3, 1991 to August 7, 1996. Shogakukan compiled its individual chapters into twenty-three tankōbon volumes, released from January 18, 1992 to November 18, 1996. Shogakukan re-released the series into eleven wideban volumes, published from December 16, 2000 to August 9, 2002.

Volume list

References

External links
Go!! Southern Ice Hockey Club at WebSunday 

1991 manga
Ice hockey mass media
Kōji Kumeta
Shogakukan manga
Shōnen manga
Sports anime and manga